The High Transitional Authority (Malagasy: Fitondrana Avon'ny Tetezamita (FAT);  or HAT) was a provisional executive body that came to power in Madagascar following the coup that forced Marc Ravalomanana to leave the country on March 17, 2009 as a result of the 2009 Malagasy protests. It was headed by Andry Rajoelina, who appointed members to the body weeks prior to the handing of executive authority from Ravalomanana to the military, which subsequently gave the authority over to the High Transitional Authority.

The HAT was primarily dominated by members of Determined Malagasy Youth, Rajoelina's party.

On September 17, 2011, a "Roadmap for Ending the Crisis in Madagascar," was signed by opposition leaders that was backed by the Southern African Development Community, or SADC. This resolution aimed at creating a stable government once more, and ending the political crisis that endured in Madagascar. The HAT repeatedly rescheduled the general election, which was held on 20 December 2013, following a first round of presidential elections on 25 October. The presidential elections in December were a runoff between Jean Louis Robinson and Hery Rajaonarimampianina, the top two candidates to emerge from the first round of voting in October. The official results of the second round were announced on 7 January 2014 with Rajaonarimampianina proclaimed the victor with nearly 54% of the vote. This election ended the HAT and restored a regular constitutional government in Madagascar.

Government of Omer Beriziky
On 28 October 2011, Rajoelina announced the selection of a Prime Minister of consensus, Omer Beriziky, who was responsible for forming a new government of consensus intended to facilitate preparations for internationally recognized presidential elections. The Beriziky government includes the following members (party affiliation in parentheses):

Jean Omer Beriziky (LEADER-Fanilo), Prime Minister
Hajo Herivelona Andrianainarivelo, Deputy Prime Minister in charge of development
Pierrot Botozaza, Deputy Prime Minister in charge of economy and industry
Pierrot Rajaonarivelo (AREMA), Minister of Foreign Affairs
Rolland Ravatomanga, Minister of Agriculture
Olga Ramalason (TIM), Minister of Trade
Harry Laurent Rahajason, Minister of Communication
Elia Ravelomanantsoa (Our Madagascar), Minister of Culture and Heritage
Ruffine Tsiranana, Minister of Decentralisation
Julien Reboza (AVI), Minister of Water
Régis Manoro, Minister of Education
Ihanta Randriamandranto, Minister of Animal Husbandry
Nestor Razafindrorika, Minister of Energy
Etienne Hilaire Razafindehibe, Minister of Higher Education
Jean André Ndremanjary, Minister of Technical Education and Professional Training
(vacant), Minister of Environment and Forests
Hery Rajaonarimampianina, Minister of Finance
Tabera Randriamanantsoa, Minister of the Civil Service
General Lucien Rakotoarimasy, Minister of the Armed Forces
Marcel Bernard, Minister of Hydrocarbons
Florent Rakotoarisoa, Minister of Interior
Jacques Ulrich Randriantiana, Minister of Youth and Leisure
Christine Ranazamahasoa, Minister of Justice
Daniella Randrianfeno Tolotrandry Rajo, Minister of Mines
Sylvain Manoriky, Minister of Fishery and Ocean Resources
Olga Vaomalala Ramaroson, Minister of Population
Andriamanjato Ny Hasina, Minister of Mail, Telecommunication and New Technology
Elisa Zafitombo Alibena, Minister of Crafts Industry
Victor Manantsoa, Minister of Relations with Institutions
Johanita Ndahimananjara (AVI), Minister of Public Health
Police Controller-General Arsène Rakotondrazaka, Minister of Internal Security
Gérard Botralahy, Minister of Sports
Jean Max Rakotomamonjy (LEADER-Fanilo), Minister of Tourism
Benjamina Ramarcel Ramanantsoa, Minister of Transport
Colonel Botomanovatsara, Minister of Public Works and Meteorology
General Randrianazary, Secretary of State at the National Gendarmerie

Government of Camille Vital
The HAT Prime Minister before October 2011 was General Camille Vital. Among the members of his government were:

Christine Razanamahasoa, Minister of justice
Organès Rakotomihantarizaka, Minister of homeland security
Hajo Andrianainarivelo, Minister of Decentralization and Regional Planning 
Masimana Manantsoa, Minister of the Interior
Benja Razafimahaleo (LEADER-Fanilo), Minister of Finance and Budget 
Julien Razafimanjato, Minister of education
Augustin Andriamananoro, Minister of telecommunications
Mario Rakotovao, Minister of the environment

See also
Politics of Madagascar

References

External links

Provisional governments
Politics of Madagascar
Government of Madagascar